The 2019–20 NACAM Formula 4 Championship season was the fifth season of the NACAM Formula 4 Championship. It began on 25 October 2019 at the Autódromo Hermanos Rodríguez in Mexico City and ended on 18 October 2020 at Autódromo de Monterrey after seven rounds.

Teams and drivers

Race calendar

All rounds were held in Mexico. The first round was held in support of the 2019 Mexican Grand Prix.
Following the fourth round, the remainder of the season was altered due to the 2019-20 coronavirus pandemic.  On 17 August 2020 it was announced that the fifth round scheduled at Parque Tangamanga was moved to Autódromo de Querétaro, which also hosted the sixth round.  On 9 October 2020 the series announced a new date for the season finale.

Championship standings

Points were awarded to the top 10 classified finishers in each race.

Drivers' Championship

References

External links 

  

2019
Nacam
Nacam
Nacam
Nacam
Nacam
Nacam